Campanula cochleariifolia (also Campanula cochlearifolia), common name earleaf bellflower or fairy's-thimble, is a species of flowering plant in the family Campanulaceae, native to the Pyrenees, Alps, French Massif Central, and Carpathian Mountains of Central Europe. Clumps of bright green leaves produce nodding pale blue bell flowers on wiry stalks. It is often found growing on limestone.

This plant has gained the Royal Horticultural Society's Award of Garden Merit.

References

External links

cochleariifolia
Flora of the Alps
Flora of the Carpathians
Flora of the Pyrenees
Plants described in 1785